The Amazing Race 19 is the nineteenth season of the American reality television show The Amazing Race. It featured eleven teams of two competing in a race around the world. 

The season premiered on CBS on September 25, 2011, and the finale aired on December 11, 2011.

Engaged couple Ernie Halvorsen and Cindy Chiang were the winners of this season, while dating couple Jeremy Cline and Sandy Draghi finished in second place, and married couple Marcus and Amani Pollard finished in third.

Production

Development and filming

This season included first-time visits to Denmark, Indonesia, Malawi, and Belgium. Filming started on June 18, 2011, with teams seen leaving Los Angeles International Airport and heading to Taiwan. As with the previous season, racers had a task they had to perform before receiving tickets to their first destination. American film crews were also spotted in Hillerød, Denmark. 

Two new game elements were introduced in this season. Leg 1 introduced the Hazard: a penalty that one team incurred for being the last team to finish the starting line task. According to Phil Keoghan, the Hazard was added to "test people's mental strength out of the gate", and claimed that it had a "rolling effect" throughout the rest of the season. Leg 2 was the first time in which two teams were eliminated at the pit stop.

During the first leg, Kaylani Paliotta lost her passport at a gas station while en route from Hsi Lai Temple to Los Angeles International Airport. Kaylani & Lisa returned to the gas station to search for the passport, but could not find it and opted to proceed to the airport, hoping that another racer had picked it up. The camera crew accompanying the team had seen the dropped passport, but could not act on it, and instead informed production of the situation. Production prepared to conduct an impromptu elimination and Phil Keoghan rushed to the airport. The passport was found by two bystanders who had previously helped another team at the gas station. After posting about the incident on Twitter, a fan of the show advised them to take the passport to the airport, and they were able to return it to Kaylani before her scheduled flight.

Leg 5 was supposed to take place in Laos. However, a monsoon caused heavy flooding in the country and forced the production team to construct an additional leg in Thailand instead. Laos would eventually be visited later in The Amazing Race 31.

Marketing
Discover gift card returned as one of the sponsors. Travelocity continued to sponsor the show, while Ford also returned as one of the sponsors, with their fifth generation Ford Mustang appearing as a prize car in the 10th leg, customized by the winner.

Cast

Some of the more prominent members of the cast included Survivor: Africa winner Ethan Zohn and Survivor: The Amazon winner Jenna Morasca, former sailor Zac Sunderland, professional snowboarders Andy Finch and Tommy Czeschin and former American football tight end Marcus Pollard.

Future appearances
Ernie & Cindy appeared on the final episode of The Amazing Race 29 where they handed tickets to the final three teams entering Wrigley Field in their hometown of Chicago.

Ethan Zohn returned to compete on Survivor: Winners at War.

Results
The following teams are listed with their placements in each leg. Placements are listed in finishing order. 
A  placement with a dagger indicates that the team was eliminated. 
An  placement with a double-dagger indicates that the team was the last to arrive at a pit stop in a non-elimination leg, and had to perform a Speed Bump task in the following leg. 
 An italicized and underlined placement indicates that the team was the last to arrive at a pit stop, but there was no rest period at the pit stop and all teams were instructed to continue racing. There was no required Speed Bump task in the next leg.
 A  indicates that the team used an Express Pass on that leg to bypass one of their tasks.
 A  indicates that the team used the U-Turn and a  indicates the team on the receiving end of the U-Turn.

Notes

Race summary

Leg 1 (United States → Taiwan)

Episode 1: "Kindness of Strangers" (September 25, 2011)
Prize: The Express Pass (awarded to Ernie & Cindy)
Locations
Hacienda Heights, California (Hsi Lai Temple) (Starting Line)
 Los Angeles → Taipei, Taiwan
 Taipei (Ximending Commercial District)
Taipei (Taipei Confucius Temple) 
Taipei (Core Pacific City Mall) 
Taipei (Dajia Riverside Park)
Taipei (Martyrs' Shrine) 
Episode summary
At Hsi Lai Temple, teams had to search through hundreds of oil-paper umbrellas for one that had the correct set of letters – TAI – printed on it. When combined twice with their clue of six other letters – WANPEI – it revealed the name of their first destination: Taipei, Taiwan. Once they presented Phil with a correct umbrella, he gave them keys to one of the vehicles parked outside the temple. The last team to complete this task (Kaylani & Lisa) would be penalized with a Hazard later in the leg. 
The first eight teams to arrive at Los Angeles International Airport were booked on an earlier flight to Taipei via China Airlines with the remaining three teams booked on a second flight via EVA Air that departed twenty minutes later. Once in Taipei, teams had to travel to the Ximending Commercial District, where they were told to "look up" for their next clue and had to figure out that their clue was displayed on a digital billboard at Jun Plaza: red and yellow balloons that revealed the Chinese characters  (Taipei Confucius Temple).
 In this season's first Roadblock, one team member had to find a nearby payphone and call a given phone number. The person on the other end gave the racer one of Confucius's proverbs: "In all things, success depends on previous preparation, and without such previous preparation, there is sure to be failure." Without writing down any of the message, they had to repeat the proverb verbatim to a monk in order to receive their next clue. If they were incorrect, they had to call the number again before trying again.
 The Hazard required Kaylani & Lisa to travel to the Core Pacific City Mall, where one of them had to perform an indoor bungee jump before they could continue racing.
After completing the Roadblock, teams had to make their way to Dajia Riverside Park, where they had to join a dragon boat team. One team member kept pace by beating a drum while the other team member joined the paddling crew on the Keelung River. Once they made it through the course, they received their next clue directing them to the pit stop: the Martyrs' Shrine in Taipei.
Additional notes
This was a non-elimination leg.

Leg 2 (Taiwan → Indonesia)

Episode 2: "The Sprint of Our Life" (October 2, 2011)
Prize: A trip to the Carton House in Ireland (awarded to Andy & Tommy)
Eliminated: Ron & Bill  Ethan & Jenna
Locations
Taipei (Martyrs' Shrine) 
 Taipei → Jakarta, Indonesia
 Jakarta → Yogyakarta
Piyungan (Bukit Indah Restaurant & Hotel) (Unaired)
Semanu (Goa Jomblang)  
Yogyakarta (Intersections near Yogyakarta's Kilometer Zero  Mal Malioboro) 
Yogyakarta (Aisyiyah Orphanage)
Yogyakarta (Kraton Ngayogyakarta Hadiningrat) 
Episode summary
At the beginning of this leg, teams were instructed to fly to Jakarta, Indonesia. Once in Jakarta, teams had to travel by train to Yogyakarta, and then make their way to Goa Jomblang, where teams found their next clue.
 In this leg's Roadblock, one team member had to descend  into Goa Jomblang and search for a traditional Javanese mask and a dagger known as a kris. Once they located them, team members had to climb a bamboo ladder and deliver them to the chieftain in exchange for their next clue.
 For their Speed Bump, Bill & Cathi had to untangle a rope until they had enough length to reach a carabiner across a field before they could continue with the Roadblock.
 This season's first Detour was a choice between Shake Your Money Maker or Be a Ticket Taker. In Shake Your Money Maker, teams had to dress in costumes, with one team member dancing in the streets while the other played a gamelan, and had to earn Rp 30,000 (roughly $3.40) in order to receive their next clue. In Be a Ticket Taker, teams had to go to the Mal Malioboro, work as motorbike parking attendants, and earn Rp 15,000 (roughly $1.70) before exchanging their ticket book for their next clue.
After completing either Detour, teams traveled to the Aisyiyah Orphanage, home to orphans of the 2010 eruptions of Mount Merapi, where they had to donate all of the money in their possession. Teams received a coat of arms from the children and had to figure out that it belonged to the Sultan and that the pit stop was at his palace: Kraton Ngayogyakarta Hadiningrat. Eight of the teams arrived at the pit stop without having donated all of their money as they'd been instructed, and had to go back before they could check in. 
Additional notes
In an unaired segment, teams traveled to the Bukit Indah Restaurant & Hotel after arriving in Yogyakarta, where they had to randomly choose a key, which was marked with one of two departure times the next morning.
This was a double-elimination episode.

Leg 3 (Indonesia)

Episode 3: "Don't Lay Down on Me Now!" (October 9, 2011)
Prize: A trip to Atlantis The Palm, Dubai (awarded to Andy & Tommy)
Eliminated: Kaylani & Lisa
Locations
Yogyakarta (Kraton Ngayogyakarta Hadiningrat) 
 Yogyakarta (Fort Vredeburg)
Salakmalang Village (Lesehan Restaurant) 
Magelang (Borobudur)  
Episode summary
At the beginning of this leg, teams had to join a series of Dutch colonial-era Bicycle Guard reenactors and ride omafiets with their group from Kraton through the streets of Yogyakarta to Fort Vredeburg, where they received their next clue directing them to the Salakmalang Village.
 This leg's Detour was a choice between Rice Field or Grass Fed. In Rice Field, teams carried lunch to rice paddy workers and, while the workers ate their lunch, planted 300 rice seedlings in order to receive their next clue. In Grass Fed, teams had to fill two bags with freshly cut grass and then pick up two sheep from a shed. After delivering the grass and sheep to a farm, they had to retrieve six buckets of water from a well, using only two buckets at a time, in order to fill a trough for the sheep and receive their next clue.
After completing the Detour, teams traveled to the Borobudur. They had to use the international entrance, where they were given batik sarongs to put on. They then walked up to the top of the temple, where they received their next clue.
 In this leg's Roadblock, one team member had to walk around the top tier of the Borobudur in a clockwise direction, counting the statues of the Five Dhyani Buddhas, while also paying attention to the mudra depicted on the statues. Each racer had to provide the correct numbers of Buddhas by mudra, including a demonstration of each, in order to receive their next clue, which directed them to the nearby pit stop.

Leg 4 (Indonesia → Thailand)

Episode 4: "This Is Gonna Be a Fine Mess" (October 16, 2011)
Prize: 5,000 each (awarded to Andy & Tommy)
Locations
Yogyakarta (Sheraton Mustika Yogyakarta Resort & Spa) 
 Yogyakarta → Phuket, Thailand
Mueang Phuket (Nonthasak Marina)
 Ao Phang Nga National Park (Khai Nai Island) 
 Ao Phang Nga National Park (Soap Island)
 Ao Phang Nga National Park (Koh Yao Noi) 
 Ao Phang Nga National Park (Koh Panyi – Soccer Field) 
Episode summary
At the beginning of this leg, teams were instructed to fly to Phuket, Thailand. Once in Phuket, teams had to travel to the Nonthasak Marina in order to find their next clue.
 This leg's Detour was a choice between Coral Reconstruction or Beach Preparation, both tasks designed to help Thailand recover following the 2004 tsunami. In each task, teams rode on speedboats to Khai Nai Island. In Coral Reconstruction, teams built a coral nursery out of pipes. Once complete, they used a kayak to take the nursery and several coral fragments out to a buoy where they had to set the nursery on the ocean floor and then properly set the coral fragments into the nursery in order to receive their next clue. In Beach Preparation, teams had to properly set up a series of twenty beach chairs and ten umbrellas marked with a specific symbol given in their clue in order to receive their next clue.
After completing the Detour, teams were given a compass and a medallion and were instructed to travel north for thirteen minutes until they reached the island shown on the medallion: Soap Island.
 In this leg's Roadblock, teams traveled to Koh Yao Noi, where one team member had to climb the island's sheer rock wall until they reached a bird's nest that held their next clue.
After the Roadblock, teams were given a map of Phang Nga province and a compass and were instructed to lead their boat captain to the pit stop at Koh Panyi.
Additional notes
This was a non-elimination leg.

Leg 5 (Thailand)

Episode 5: "I Feel Like I'm in the Circus"  (October 23, 2011)
Prize: A trip to Bali, Indonesia (awarded to Amani & Marcus)
Eliminated: Liz & Marie
Locations
Ao Phang Nga National Park (Koh Panyi – Soccer Field) 
Mueang Phang Nga (Ton Pariwat Wildlife Conservation Area – Anda Adventures)  
Mueang Phang Nga (Song Phraek – Spirit House Shop)
Mueang Phang Nga (Noppring – Wat Chanathikaram) 
 Mueang Phuket → Bangkok
Bangkok (Wat Suwannaram – Bangkok Noi Canal)
Bangkok (M.R. Kukrit Heritage House) 
Episode summary
At the beginning of this leg, teams had to travel to the Ton Pariwat Wildlife Conservation Area. There, teams had to ride elephants up the Khlong Song Phraek River to their next clue.
 For their Speed Bump, Liz & Marie had to clean up elephant dung and wash an elephant before they could ride it to the Roadblock.
 In this leg's first Roadblock, one team member searched for a man playing a traditional Thai flute and then had to search the water around him for a bundle that contained a ceramic carp with their clue inside.
After completing the first Roadblock, teams had to travel to a nearby store, take apart a traditional spirit house, and then deliver it to Wat Chanathikaram, where they found their next clue.
 In this leg's second Roadblock, the team member who did not perform the previous Roadblock had to correctly rebuild the spirit house in order to receive a bag of fish food and their next clue.
After completing the second Roadblock, teams had to travel by bus to Bangkok and then make their way to the Bangkok Noi Canal, where they had to feed the fish at the canal in order to receive their next clue. Teams were then directed to the pit stop: the M.R. Kukrit Heritage House in Bangkok.

Leg 6 (Thailand → Malawi)

Episode 6: "We Love Your Country Already; It Is Very Spacious" (October 30, 2011)
Prize: A trip for two to the British Virgin Islands (awarded to Andy & Tommy)
Locations
Bangkok (M.R. Kukrit Heritage House) 
 Bangkok → Lilongwe, Malawi
Lilongwe (Limbe Tobacco Warehouse) 
Lilongwe (Memorial Tower)
Lilongwe (Old Market – White Horse De-Signs Tailor Shop  Lilongwe LEA School) 
Lilongwe (Mchesi – R-K Furniture Shop)
Lilongwe (Kumbali Village) 
Episode summary
At the beginning of this leg, teams were instructed to fly to Lilongwe, Malawi. Once in Lilongwe, teams had to make their way to Limbe Tobacco Warehouse, where they found their next clue.
 In this leg's Roadblock, one team member had to transport ten  bales of tobacco leaves through a warehouse, using only a handcart that could carry one bag at a time, to a drop-off zone in another part of the warehouse in order to receive their next clue.
After completing the Roadblock, teams had to travel to the Memorial Tower, where they found their next clue.
 This leg's Detour was a choice between All Sewn Up or Not Grown Up. In All Sewn Up, teams went to the White Horse De-Sign Tailor Shop in the old market and chose a customer. They then used manual sewing machines to finish the customer's suit in order to receive their next clue. In Not Grown Up, teams traveled to Lilongwe LEA School, where they had to use provided materials to build two toy trucks. Once they were properly constructed, the headmistress gave the trucks to students, who tested them before the team received their next clue.
After completing the Detour, teams had to make their way to the R-K Furniture Shop, where they had to transport two handcrafted wooden beds to Kumbali Village and then carry the beds to the pit stop. They were allowed to ask the shop owner to call a truck for them. Teams used the beds to spend the night at the village.
Additional notes
This was a non-elimination leg.

Leg 7 (Malawi)

Episode 7: "Move Goat" (November 6, 2011)
Prize:  15,000 (awarded to Andy & Tommy)
Eliminated: Justin & Jennifer
Locations
Lilongwe (Kumbali Village) 
 Lilongwe → Salima  
Chigumukile Village (Lake Malawi) 
Chigumukile Village (Jamaica Shop) 
Senga Bay (Sunbird Livingstonia Beach) 
Episode summary
At the beginning of this leg, teams were instructed to travel by bus to Salima.
 In this leg's Roadblock, one team member had to use a bicycle taxi known as a kabaza to take a customer carrying fish to one of three different destinations written on a board tied to the fish. After they dropped off their customer at their required address, they headed back to the bus station to trade their earnings of MK100 (roughly $0.66) for their next clue.
 For their Speed Bump, Amani & Marcus had to solve a sliding puzzle that depicted the flag of Malawi before they could continue racing.
 This leg's Detour on Lake Malawi was a choice between Dugout or Lugout. In Dugout, teams had to participate in the annual Lake Malawi Dugout Canoe Race and use a traditional canoe to paddle out to drummers on the lake before paddling back to shore in order to receive their clue. In Lugout, teams had to wade to a ferryboat on the lake and unload passengers and cargo by carrying them ashore. Once they unloaded all of the cargo and passengers, they received their clue. 
After completing the Detour, teams had to travel to the Jamaica Shop in Chigumukile Village, where they received their next clue directing them to the pit stop: Sunbird Livingstonia Beach at Senga Bay.
Additional notes
Ernie & Cindy used their Express Pass to bypass the Detour on this leg.
 Laurence & Zac attempted to use the U-Turn on Amani & Marcus. However, Amani & Marcus had already passed the U-Turn by this point and were therefore unaffected.

Leg 8 (Malawi → Denmark)

Episode 8: "Super Shady" (November 13, 2011)
Prize: A trip to Fiji (awarded to Ernie & Cindy)
Eliminated: Laurence & Zac
Locations
Senga Bay (Sunbird Livingstonia Beach) 
 Lilongwe → Copenhagen, Denmark
Copenhagen (Church of Our Saviour)
Hillerød (Frederiksborg Slot) 
Kongens Lyngby (Frilandsmuseet) 
Kongens Lyngby (Karlstrup Windmill) 
Copenhagen (Larsens Plads – Havet Sailing Ship) 
Episode summary
At the beginning of this leg, teams were instructed to fly to Copenhagen, Denmark. Once in Copenhagen, teams had to drive to the Church of Our Saviour, where they had to climb to the top of the church and search for two clues on the top of the tower. The first was a flag on the tower that said Borg Slot and the other was a banner on a nearby building that said Frederiks. These led teams to their next location: Frederiksborg Slot in Hillerød.
 In this leg's Roadblock, one team member had to don Renaissance period clothing and perform a complex three-part Renaissance dance to the satisfaction of a countess in order to receive their next clue.
After completing the Roadblock, teams had to make their way to the Frilandsmuseet, where they found their next clue.
 This leg's Detour was a choice between All Hopped Up or All Churned Out. In All Hopped Up, teams had to lay out a proper rabbit show jumping course. They then had to pick a rabbit and each team member had to run it through the course without knocking over any of the obstacles in order to receive their next clue. In All Churned Out, teams had to use a traditional butter churn to churn fresh cream into butter and then cleanly stamp out six sticks of butter using a special mold in order to receive their next clue.
After completing the Detour, teams had to travel to the Karlstrup Windmill in Kongens Lyngby in order to find their next clue, which directed them to the pit stop: the Havet, a sailing ship docked at Larsens Plads in Copenhagen.
Additional notes
 This leg featured a Double U-Turn. Ernie & Cindy chose to use the U-Turn on Bill & Cathi, while Bill & Cathi chose to use the U-Turn on Laurence & Zac.

Leg 9 (Denmark → Germany → Belgium)

Episode 9: "It's Speedo Time" (November 20, 2011)
Prize: A trip to Panama (awarded to Amani & Marcus)
Locations
Copenhagen (Larsens Plads – Havet Sailing Ship) 
Copenhagen (Andersens Boulevard – Statue of Hans Christian Andersen) 
Billund (Legoland Billund)
Hamburg, Germany (Hamburg Hauptbahnhof)
 Hamburg → Brussels, Belgium
Brussels (European Parliament Building) 
Brussels (Concert Noble)
Brussels (Parc Élisabeth) 
Episode summary
At the beginning of this leg, teams had locate the Statue of Hans Christian Andersen in Copenhagen, where they found their next clue.
 In this leg's Roadblock, one team member had to memorize a poem on the base of the statue of and then use a map on a provided bicycle's wheel to navigate to the Teatermuseet i Hofteatret, where they had to recite the poem verbatim and with dramatic flair in order to receive their next clue. If they failed, they had to go back to the statue before returning to the theater to try again.
After completing the Roadblock, teams had to travel to Legoland Billund and find the Pirate Carousel, where they received a box of Lego bricks. While on the ride, they had to assemble the puzzle, which revealed their next destination: the Hamburg Hauptbahnhof in Hamburg, Germany. Teams could work on the puzzle only while the ride was in motion and had to raise their hands when the ride stopped. 
Teams had to travel to the train station in Hamburg in order to find their next clue, which instructed them to travel by train to Brussels, Belgium. Once in Brussels, teams had to make their way to the European Parliament Building, where they found their next clue.
At Concert Noble, teams had to compete in a bodybuilding competition in honor of Jean-Claude Van Damme. Racers had to put on bikinis, cover their bodies with posing oil, and then learn a series of bodybuilding poses. Teams had to perform the routine in front of three judges and earn a score of at least twelve points in order to receive their next clue.
Teams had to check in at the pit stop: Parc Élisabeth in Brussels.
Additional notes
The bodybuilding task was one task from a Detour and was titled Bodybuilding Posedown, but was not presented as such in the episode.
There was no rest period at the end of this leg, and all teams were instead instructed to continue racing.

Leg 10 (Belgium)

Episode 10: "Release the Brake!" (November 27, 2011)
Prize: A Ford Mustang for each team member (awarded to Andy & Tommy)
Eliminated: Bill & Cathi
Locations
Lommel (Ford Proving Grounds) 
Ghent (Hoofdbrug) 
Ghent (Hoefslagstraatje & Leie River  Dulle Griet) 
Geraardsbergen (Muur van Geraardsbergen)
Beersel (Steenweg op Ukkel 75  Stoofstraat 52)
Brussels (Atomium) 
Episode summary
At the beginning of this leg, teams had to drive themselves to the Ford Proving Grounds in Lommel, where they found their next clue.
 In this leg's Roadblock, one team member had to test drive a Ford Mustang. They then had to navigate a slalom course within sixteen seconds without hitting a cone and stop inside a marked spot. Lastly, they finished by performing two victory doughnuts before receiving their next clue.
After completing the Roadblock, teams had to travel to the Hoofdbrug in Ghent in order to find their next clue.
 This leg's Detour was a choice between Water or Waffle. In Water, teams had to use provided materials to build a raft and search the Leie River for the two halves of their next clue. In Waffle, teams had to build a waffle stand and then bake and decorate eighteen Belgian waffles to the chef's satisfaction before receiving their next clue.
After completing the Detour, teams had to travel to the Muur van Geraardsbergen, where they released a flock of homing pigeons and were then given an address where the pigeons were flying. Once there, teams could retrieve their next clue from one of the pigeons – a picture of the Atomium – which teams had to identify in order to find the pit stop.

Leg 11 (Belgium → Panama)

Episode 11: "We Are Charlie Chaplin" (December 4, 2011)
Prize: A trip to the Turks and Caicos Islands (awarded to Jeremy & Sandy)
Eliminated: Andy & Tommy
Locations
Brussels (Atomium) 
Brussels (Rue de l'Étuve – The Adventures of Tintin Mural)
 Brussels → Amsterdam, Netherlands
 Amsterdam →  Panama City, Panama
 Chagres National Park (Puerto El Corotu & Parara Puru)
Panama City (San Francisco – San Francisco Bay Towers) 
Panama City (Plaza de Francia – Ferdinand de Lesseps Statue)
Panama City (El Mercado de Mariscos  Salsipuedes Market) 
Panama City (Cathedral Square)
Panama City (Panamá Viejo) 
Episode summary
At the beginning of this leg, teams had to dress up as the two detectives from the Belgian The Adventures of Tintin comic, and had to figure out one of the three names by which the characters are known in Belgium. Then, using a photo given to them with the clue, teams had to find a man dressed as Tintin standing in front of a Tintin mural and tell him any variation of the characters' names in order to receive their next clue. Teams were instructed to travel by train to Amsterdam, Netherlands, and then fly to Panama City, Panama. Once in Panama City, teams had to travel by boat to Parara Puru, where they signed up for one of four times the next morning to receive a temporary tattoo which revealed their next location: the San Francisco Bay Towers in San Francisco.
 In this leg's Roadblock, one team member had to cross a  tightrope between the 35-story towers, pick up their clue from the other tower, and then cross back to the first tower.
After completing the Roadblock, teams were given a riddle – "Success in Suez led him to Panama. His failure inspired others to succeed. Find him beneath a rooster and you'll find your next clue." – directing them to the statue of Ferdinand de Lesseps in the Plaza de Francia.
 This season's final Detour was a choice between Filet or Sole. In Filet, teams traveled to Panama's largest fish market, where they had to deliver fish to different stalls throughout the market. Each stall only accepted a certain kind of fish up to a certain weight. Once they were done with their deliveries, they received their next clue. In Sole, teams traveled to the Salsipuedes Market, where they had to find a sandal stall and use one piece of leather each to make the sole and strapping for a pair of sandals in order to receive their next clue.
After completing the Detour, teams had to travel to Cathedral Square, where they had to find a group of tamborito dancers wearing pollera dresses and had to find the location of the pit stop – Panamá Viejo – which was etched on the dancers' necklaces and written on one dancer's dress.

Leg 12 (Panama → United States)

Episode 12: "Go Out and Get It Done" (December 11, 2011)
Winners: Ernie & Cindy
Second Place: Jeremy & Sandy
Third Place: Amani & Marcus
Locations
Panama City (Panamá Viejo) 
 Panama City → Atlanta, Georgia
Atlanta (FlightSafety International)
Atlanta (Margaret Mitchell House) 
Atlanta (Turner Field)
Atlanta (Swan House) 
Episode summary
At the beginning of this leg, teams were instructed to fly to Atlanta, Georgia. Once in Atlanta, teams had to make their way to FlightSafety International, where they had to select a flight instructor, who taught them how to operate a Learjet flight simulator.
Teams' next clue instructed teams to "find the former residence known as The Dump", which teams had to figure out was the former home of Margaret Mitchell, author of Gone with the Wind.
 In this season's final Roadblock, one team member had to type out their next clue using a vintage Remington 3 typewriter, duplicating an example message perfectly and with no mistakes. Additionally, as the typewriters did not have a key for the number 1, they had to figure out that they could use the lower-case letter l as a substitute.
After completing the Roadblock, teams had to figure out that the three numbers on the clue were an homage to Hank Aaron: 44 (his uniform number), 715 (the number of home runs he hit to break the Major League Baseball home run record) and 74 (the year in which he broke the record). Teams had to figure out that they needed to go to Turner Field, where one team member had loop a rope through a series of carabiners, each representing a specific country on a large unlabeled vertical map, to map out the racecourse while their teammate gave help from the ground below. Once they had the correct course, teams could receive their final clue, which directed them to the finish line at the Swan House in Atlanta.

Reception

Critical response
The Amazing Race 19 received mixed reviews. Andy Dehnart of reality blurred wrote that this season was "yet another example of the race dumbing itself down." Scott Von Doviak of The A.V. Club wrote that he'd "have to rank this as one of the lesser seasons, probably in the bottom third. Too many lackluster teams and tasks, too many non-elimination legs, and the absence of any compelling heroes and villains all added to a rather disappointing trip around the globe." Daniel Fienberg of HitFix wrote that the season "left me frustrated more often than it left me exhilarated" calling it lackluster due to "Too many Non-Elimination Legs too early. Too many bland, copacetic couples. Too many bland, copacetic couples who, predictably, got along too well." Luke Dwyer of TV Fanatic graded this season with a B saying "the majority of the legs and destinations were good, but not great. The cast was likable, but beyond Andy and Tommy, nothing spectacular. The finale was a dud and that's always going to bring the feel of the season down." Michael Hewitt of the Orange County Register wrote that "the Race had been losing a bit of its mojo for several seasons, hitting bottom with the spring's Second Chances edition. This fall's 19th Race was much improved, though, and it remains the most brilliantly shot and edited show on TV" and that this season had "a few more challenging challenges and the clues often required some solving on the parts of the contestants." In 2016, this season was ranked 17th out of the first 27 seasons by the Rob Has a Podcast Amazing Race correspondents. Kareem Gantt of Screen Rant wrote that this season "had some legs that kind of underwhelmed, but overall, the drama and suspense of the race trumped the season's shortcomings, which were rather minute, to be honest." In 2021, Jane Andrews of Gossip Cop ranked this season as the show's 8th best season. Val Barone of TheThings ranked this season as the show's 8th best season. In 2022, Jason Shomer of Collider ranked this season among the show's top seven seasons. In 2022, Rhenn Taguiam of Game Rant ranked this season as the fourth-best season.

Ratings
U.S. Nielsen ratings

Episode 9, "It's Speedo Time", went up against the 2011 American Music Awards.
Episode 12, "Go Out and Get It Done", the season finale, began airing at 8:42pm ET due to an NFL Overrun and scored season highs in viewers and all demos.

Canadian ratings
Canadian broadcaster CTV also aired The Amazing Race on Sundays at 8:00 p.m. Eastern, Central, & Atlantic (9:00 p.m. Pacific & Mountain).

Episode 3, "Don't Lay Down on Me Now!", aired on the Sunday before Canadian Thanksgiving Day.

References

External links
Official website

 19
2011 American television seasons
Television shows filmed in California
Television shows filmed in Taiwan
Television shows filmed in Indonesia
Television shows filmed in Thailand
Television shows filmed in Malawi
Television shows filmed in Kenya
Television shows filmed in the Netherlands
Television shows filmed in Denmark
Television shows filmed in Germany
Television shows filmed in Belgium
Television shows filmed in Panama
Television shows filmed in Atlanta